This is a list of field corps of the United States and Confederate States armies and the United States Marine Corps.

Active corps 
, there are five active Army corps.

 I Corps
 III Corps
 V Corps
 XVIII Airborne Corps
 U.S. Army Corps of Engineers

Former corps of the World War/Cold War/Gulf War eras 

 I Armored Corps
 II Corps
 II Armored Corps
 III Armored Corps
 IV Corps
 IV Armored Corps
 VI Corps
 VII Corps
 VIII Corps
 IX Corps
 X Corps
 XI Corps
 XII Corps
 XIII Corps
 XIV Corps
 XV Corps
 XVI Corps
 XIX Corps
 XX Corps
 XXI Corps
 XXII Corps
 XXIII Corps
 XXIV Corps
 XXXIII Corps – World War II – see Fourteenth United States Army
 XXXV Airborne Corps – World War II deception formation – see Operation Pastel
 XXXVI Corps (1944–1945)
 U.S. XXXVII Corps- World War II – see Fourteenth United States Army

World War II U.S. Marine Corps corps 
 I Marine Amphibious Corps
 III Amphibious Corps
 V Amphibious Corps

Spanish–American War corps 

 First Army Corps (Spanish–American War)
 Second Army Corps (Spanish–American War)
 Third Army Corps (Spanish–American War)
 Fourth Army Corps (Spanish–American War)
 Fifth Army Corps (Spanish–American War)
 Sixth Army Corps (Spanish–American War)
 Seventh Army Corps (Spanish–American War)
 Eighth Army Corps (Spanish–American War)

Civil War Union Army corps 

 I Corps
 II Corps
 III Corps
 IV Corps
 V Corps
 VI Corps
 VII Corps
 VIII Corps
 IX Corps
 X Corps
 XI Corps
 XII Corps
 XIII Corps
 XIV Corps
 XV Corps
 XVI Corps
 XVII Corps
 XVIII Corps
 XIX Corps
 XX Corps
 XXI Corps
 XXII Corps
 XXIII Corps
 XXIV Corps
 XXV Corps
 Cavalry Corps

Confederate States Army corps 

 First Corps, Army of the Mississippi
 Second Corps, Army of the Mississippi
 Third Corps, Army of the Mississippi
 First Corps, Army of Northern Virginia
 Second Corps, Army of Northern Virginia
 Third Corps, Army of Northern Virginia
 Fourth Corps, Army of Northern Virginia
 Cavalry Corps, Army of Northern Virginia
 First Corps, Army of the Potomac
 Second Corps, Army of the Potomac
 First Corps, Army of Tennessee
 Second Corps, Army of Tennessee

Notes

References

Corps